This is a list of state leaders in the 15th century (1401–1500) AD, of the Holy Roman Empire.

Main

Holy Roman Empire in Germany

Holy Roman Empire, Kingdom of Germany (complete list, complete list) –
Rupert, King (1400–1410)
Jobst of Moravia, contested King (1410–1411)
Sigismund, Holy Roman Emperor (1433–1437), King (1410–1437)
Albert II, King (1438–1439)
Frederick III, Holy Roman Emperor (1452–1493), King (1440–1493)
Maximilian I, Emperor Elect (1508–1519), King (1486–1519)

Austrian

Duchy/ Archduchy of Austria (complete list) –
Albert IV the Patient, Duke (1395–1404)
Albert V, Duke (1404–1439)
Ladislaus I the Posthumous, Duke (1440–1453), Archduke (1453–1457)
Frederick V the Peaceful, Archduke (1457–1493)
Maximilian I the Last Knight, Archduke (1493–1519)

Prince-Bishopric of Brixen (complete list) –
, Prince-bishop (1396–1417)
Sebastian Stempfl, Prince-bishop (1417–1418)
, Prince-bishop (1418–1427)
, Prince-bishop (1427–1437)
, Prince-bishop (1437–1443)
, Prince-bishop (1444–1450)
Nicholas of Cusa, Prince-bishop (1450–1464)
Francesco Gonzaga, Prince-bishop (1464–1488)
Melchior von Meckau, Prince-bishop (1488–1509)

Duchy of Carinthia (complete list) –
William, Duke (1386–1406)
Ernest, Duke (1406–1424)
Frederick, Duke (1424–1493)
Maximilian I, Duke (1493–1519)

Prince-Bishopric of Chur (complete list) –
Hartmann II. Graf von Werdenberg-Sargans, Prince-bishop (1388–1416)
Johannes III. Ambundi, Prince-bishop (1416–1418)
Johannes IV. Naso, Prince-bishop (1418–1440)
Konrad von Rechberg, Administrator (1440–1441)
Heinrich IV Freiherr von Hewen, Administrator (1441–1456)
Antonius de Tosabeciis, appointed Prince-bishop (1456)
Leonhard Wismair, Prince-bishop-elect (1456–1458)
Ortlieb von Brandis, Prince-bishop (1458–1491)
Heinrich V. von Hewen, Prince-bishop (1491–1505)

Fürstenberg-Fürstenberg (complete list) –
Henry VII, Count (1408–1441)

County of Gorizia (complete list) –
Henry VI, Count (1385–1454)
John II, Count (1454–1462)
Leonhard, Count (1454–1500)

Prince-Archbishopric of Salzburg (complete list) –
Gregor Schenk of Osterwitz, Prince-archbishop (1396–1403)
Eberhard III of Neuhaus, Prince-archbishop (1403–1427)
Eberhard IV of Starhemberg, Prince-archbishop (1427–1429)
John II of Reichensperg, Prince-archbishop (1429–1441)
Frederick IV Truchseß of Emmerberg, Prince-archbishop (1441–1452)
Sigismund I of Volkersdorf, Prince-archbishop (1452–1461)
Burchard of Weissbruch, Prince-archbishop (1461–1466)
Bernhard II of Rohr, Prince-archbishop (1466–1482)
John III Peckenschlager, Prince-archbishop (1482–1489)
Friedrich V of Schallenburg, Prince-archbishop (1489–1494)
Sigismund II of Hollenegg, Prince-archbishop (1494–1495)
Leonhard von Keutschach, Prince-archbishop (1495–1519)

Duchy of Styria (complete list) –
William, Duke (1386–1406)
Ernest the Iron, Duke (1406–1424)
Frederick V, Duke (1424–1493)
Albert VI, Duke (1424–1463)
Maximilian I, Duke (1493–1519)

Prince-Bishopric of Trent (complete list) –
George I von Liechtenstein, Prince-bishop (1390–1419)
Armand de Cilli, Prince-bishop (1421)
Ernst Auer, Prince-bishop (1422)
Henry IV Flechtel, Prince-bishop (1422–1423)
Alexander of Masovia, Prince-bishop (1424–1444)
Benedikt, Prince-bishop (1444–1446)
Theobald von Wolkenstein, Prince-bishop (1444–1446)
George II Haak von Themeswald, Prince-bishop (1446–1465)
Johannes Hinderbach, Prince-bishop (1465–1486)
Ulrich III von Frundsberg, Prince-bishop (1486–1493)
Ulrich IV von Liechtenstein, Prince-bishop (1493–1505)

County of Tyrol (complete list) –
William, Count (1386–1406)
Leopold II, Regent (1396–1406)
Frederick of the Empty Pockets, Count (1406–1439)
Sigismund, Count (1439–1490)
Maximilian I, Count (1490–1519)

Bavarian

Duchy of Bavaria (complete list) –
Lower Bavaria, Bavaria-Landshut, Bavaria-Straubing, Bavaria-Munich, Bavaria-Ingolstadt, Bavaria-Dachau
Albert I, co-Duke of Bavaria (1347–1349), of Lower Bavaria (1349–1353), of Bavaria-Straubing (1353–1404)
William II, co-Duke of Bavaria-Straubing (1404–1417)
Stephen III the Magnificent, co-Duke of Bavaria except Straubing (1375–1392), Duke of Bavaria-Ingolstadt (1392–1413)
Louis VII the Bearded, Duke of Bavaria-Ingolstadt (1413–1443)
Jacqueline, contested Duchess of Bavaria-Straubing (1417–1429)
John III the Pitiless, contested Duke of Bavaria-Straubing (1417–1425)
William III, co-Duke of Bavaria-Munich (1397–1435), of Bavaria-Straubing (1429–1435)
Ernest, co-Duke of Bavaria-Munich (1397–1438), of Bavaria-Straubing (1429–1438)
Louis VIII the Hunchback, Duke of Bavaria-Ingolstadt (1443–1445)
Henry XVI the Rich, Duke of Bavaria-Landshut (1393–1450), of Bavaria-Ingolstadt (1447–1450)
Albert III, Duke of Bavaria-Munich (1438–1460)
John IV, co-Duke of Bavaria-Munich (1460–1463)
Sigismund, co-Duke of Bavaria-Munich (1460–1467), Duke of Bavaria-Dachau (1467–1501)
Louis IX the Rich, Duke of Bavaria-Landshut (1450–1479)
George I the Rich, Duke of Bavaria-Landshut (1479–1503)
Albert IV the Wise, Duke of Bavaria-Munich (1465–1505), of Bavaria (1505–1508)
William IV the Steadfast, Duke of Bavaria-Munich (1460–1508), of Bavaria-Landshut (1503–1508), of Bavaria (1508–1550)

Berchtesgaden Prince-Provostry (complete list) –
Gregorius Schenk von Osterwitz, Provost (1396–1403)
Berthold von Wehingen, Provost (1404)
Peter II Pienzenauer, Provost (1404–1432)
Johann II Praun, Provost (1432–1446)
Bernhard III Leuprechtinger, Provost (1446–1473)
Erasmus Pretschlaiffer, Provost (1473–1486)
Ulrich II Pernauer, Provost (1486–1496)
Balthasar Hirschauer, Provost (1496–1508)

Prince-Bishopric of Freising (complete list) –
Berthold of Wehingen, Prince-bishop (1381–1410)
Conrad V of Hebenstreit, Prince-bishop (1411–1412)
Hermann of Cilli, Prince-bishop (1412–1421)
Nicodemus of Scala, Prince-bishop (1421/1422–1443)
Henry II of Schlick, Prince-bishop (1443–1448)
John III Grünwald, Prince-bishop (1448–1452)
John IV Tulbeck, Prince-bishop (1453–1473)
Sixtus of Tannberg, Prince-bishop (1473–1495)
Ruprecht of the Palatinate, Prince-bishop (1495–1498)
Philip of the Palatinate, Prince-bishop (1498–1541)

Landgraviate of Leuchtenberg (de:complete list) –
John I, Landgrave (1334–1407)
Albrecht I, Landgrave (1378–1404)
John III, Landgrave (?–1458)
Leopold, Landgrave (1404–1463)
Friedrich V, Landgrave (1463–1487)
Louis I, Landgrave (1463–1486)
John IV, Landgrave (1487–1531)

Prince-Abbey of Niedermünster (complete list) –
Sophia von Daching, Abbess (1391–1410)
Katharina I von Egloffstein, Abbess (1410–1413)
Barbara I Höfferin, Abbess (1413–1417)
Herzenleid von Wildenwarth, Abbess (1417–1422)
Anna I von Streitberg, Abbess (1422–1427)
Beatrix von Rotheneck, Abbess (1427)
Osanna von Streitberg, Abbess (1427–1444)
Ursula von Tauffkirchen-Hohenrain und Höchlenbach, Abbess (1444–1448)
Ottilia von Abensberg, Abbess (1448–1475 mit)
Margarethe III von Paulstorff, Abbess (1469–1475)
Agnes von Rothafft, Abbess (1475–1520)

Prince-Abbey of Obermünster (complete list) –
Elisabeth II von Murach, Abbess (1400–1402)
Margarethe I Sattelbogerin, Abbess (?–1435)
Barbara von Absberg, Abbess (1435–1456)
Kunigunde von Egloffstein, Abbess (1456–1479)
Sibylla von Paulsdorff, Abbess (1479–1500)
Agnes II von Paulsdorff, Abbess (1500–?)

Imperial County of Ortenburg (complete list) –
George I, Count (1395–1422), Imperial Count (1395–1422)
Henry V, Count (1422–1449)
Etzel I, Count (1395–1444), Imperial Count (1422–1444)
Alram I, Count (1395–1411)
Alram II, Count (1411–1460), Imperial Count (1444–1460)
George II, Count (1449–1488), Imperial Count (1461–1488)
Sebastian I, Imperial Count (1488–1490)
Wolfgang, Count (1490–1519)

Pappenheim (complete list) –
Haupt I, Lord (1387–1409)
Haupt II, co-Lord (1409–1439)
Sigismund, co-Lord (1409–1436)
Henry, Lord (1439–1482)
William, Lord (1482–1508)

Prince-Bishopric of Passau (complete list) –
George of Hohenlohe, Prince-Bishop (1390–1423)
Leonhard of Laiming, Prince-Bishop (1423/24–1451)
Ulrich of Nußdorf, Prince-Bishop (1451–1479)
George Hessler, Prince-Bishop (1480–1482)
Friedrich Mauerkircher, Prince-Bishop (1482–1485)
Frederick of Öttingen, Prince-Bishop (1485–1490)
Christopher of Schachner, Prince-Bishop (1490–1500)
Wiguleus Fröschl of Marzoll, Prince-Bishop (1500–1517)

Prince-Bishopric of Regensburg (complete list) –
Johann von Moosburg, Prince-bishop (1384–1409)
Albert III von Stauf, Prince-bishop (1409–1421)
Johann II von Streitberg, Prince-bishop (1421–1428)
Konrad VII von Soest, Prince-bishop (1428–1437)
Friedrich II von Parsberg, Prince-bishop (1437–1450)
Friedrich III von Plankenfels, Prince-bishop (1450–1457)
Rupert I, Prince-bishop (1457–1465)
Heinrich IV von Absberg, Prince-bishop (1465–1492)
Rupert II, Prince-bishop (1492–1507)

Bohemian

Kingdom of Bohemia, Margraviate of Moravia (complete list, complete list) –
Wenceslaus IV, King (1378–1419)
Jobst of Moravia, Margrave (1375–1411)
Sigismund, King (1419–1437), Margrave (1419–1423)
Albert, King (1437–1439), Margrave (1423–1439)
Ladislaus the Posthumous, King (1453–1457), Margrave (1440–1457)
George of Poděbrady, King (1458–1471), Margrave (1458–1468)
Matthias Corvinus, disputed King (1469–1490), Margrave (1468–1490)
Vladislaus II, King (1471–1516), Margrave (1490–1516)

Duchy of Cieszyn (Teschen) (complete list) –
Przemyslaus I Noszak, Duke (1358–1410)
Boleslaus I, Duke (1410–1431)
Wenceslaus I, Duke (1431–1442)
Wladislaus, Duke (1431–1442)
Boleslaus II, Duke (1431–1452)
Przemyslaus II, Duke (1431–1477)
Casimir II, Duke (1477–1528)

Burgundian-Low Countries

County of Burgundy (complete list) –
Margaret II of Dampierre, Count (1384–1405)
Philip IV the Bold, Count (1384–1404)
John the Fearless, Count (1405–1419)
Philip V the Good, Count (1419–1467)
Charles I the Bold, Count (1467–1477)
Mary the Rich, Countess, and Maximilian, Count (1477–1482)
Philip VI the Handsome, Count (1482–1506)

County of Artois (complete list) –
For the preceding rulers, see the County of Artois under the List of state leaders in the 15th century
Philip I of Castile, Count (1482–1506)

Duchy of Brabant (complete list) –
Joanna, Duchess (1355–1406)
Anthony, Duke of Brabant, Duke (1406–1415)
John IV, Duke of Brabant, Duke (1415–1427)
Philip I of Saint-Pol, Duke (1427–1430)
Philip II the Good, Duke (1430–1467)
Charles I the Bold, Duke (1467–1477)
Mary, Duchess (1477–1482)
Maximilian, Regent (1482–1494)
Philip III, Duke (1494–1506)

County of Flanders (complete list) –
Margaret III, Countess (1384–1405)
John the Fearless, Count (1405–1419)
Philip III the Good, Count (1419–1467)
Charles II the Bold, Count (1467–1477)
Mary the Rich, Countess (1477–1482)
Philip IV the Handsome, Count (1482–1506)

County of Hainaut (complete list) –
Albert I, Count (1388–1404)
William IV, Count (1404–1417)
Jacqueline, Countess (1417–1432)
John III, Count (1418–1425)
Philip the Good, Count (1432–1467)
Charles the Bold, Count (1467–1477)
Mary of Burgundy, Count (1477–1482)
Philip the Handsome, Count (1482–1506)

County of Hainaut (complete list) –
Adolph of Cleves, Stadtholder (1477–1482)
Philip I de Croÿ, Stadtholder (1482–1511)

County of Holland and Zeeland
Counts complete list) –
Albert I, Count (1388–1404)
William VI, Count (1404–1417)
Jacqueline, Countess (1417–1432)
John III the Pitiless, Count (1417–1425)
John IV, Count (1418–1427)
Humphrey, Count (1422–1425)
Francis, Lord of Borselen, Count (1432)
Philip I the Good, Count (1432–1467)
Charles I the Bold, Count (1467–1477)
Mary I the Rich, Count (1477–1482)
Maximilian, Regent (1482–1494)
Philip II the Handsome, Count (1494–1506)
Stadtholders (complete list) –
Hugo van Lannoy, Stadtholder (1433–1440)
Willem van Lalaing, Stadtholder (1440–1445)
Gozewijn de Wilde, Stadtholder (1445–1448)
Jean de Lannoy, Stadtholder (1448–1462)
Loys of Gruuthuse, Stadtholder (1462–1477)
Wolfert VI van Borselen, Stadtholder (1477–1480)
Joost de Lalaing, Stadtholder (1480–1483)
Jan III van Egmond, Stadtholder (1483–1515)
Grand pensionaries (complete list) –
Barthout van Assendelft, Grand Pensionary (1480–1489)
Jan Bouwensz, Grand Pensionary (1489–1494)
Barthout van Assendelft, Grand Pensionary (1494–1497)
Frans Coebel van der Loo, Grand Pensionary (1500–1513)

Duchy of Limburg (complete list) –
Joanna, Duchess (1355–1406)
Anthony, Duke (1406–1415)
John IV, Duke (1415–1427)
Philip I, Duke (1427–1430)
Philip II, Duke (1430–1467)
Charles I, Duke (1467–1477)
Mary, Duchess (1477–1482)
Philip III, Duke (1494–1506)

County of Namur (complete list) –
William II, Margrave (1391–1418)
John III, Margrave (1418–1421)
Philip IV the Good, Margrave (1421–1467)
Charles I the Bold, Margrave (1467–1477)
Mary I the Rich, Margravine (1477–1482)
Maximilian, Margrave (1493–1519)

Franconian

Brandenburg-Ansbach, Brandenburg-Kulmbach (Brandenburg-Bayreuth) (complete list, complete list) –
John III, Margrave of Brandenburg-Ansbach (1398–1420)
Frederick I, Elector (1415–1440), Margrave of Brandenburg-Ansbach (1398–1440), of Brandenburg-Kulmbach (1420–1440)
John VI the Alchemist, Margrave of Brandenburg-Ansbach (1440–1457)
Albrecht III Achilles, Margrave of Brandenburg-Ansbach (1440–1486), of Brandenburg-Kulmbach (1457–1486), Elector (1471–1486)
Siegmund, Margrave of Brandenburg-Ansbach (1486–1495)
Frederick the Elder, Margrave of Brandenburg-Ansbach (1486–1536), of Brandenburg-Kulmbach (1495–1515)

Prince-Bishopric of Bamberg (complete list) –
Albrecht von Wertheim, Prince-bishop (1399–1421)
Friedrich III von Aufsess, Prince-bishop (1421–1431)
Anton von Rotenhan, Prince-bishop (1431–1459)
Georg I von Schaumberg, Prince-bishop (1459–1475)
Philipp von Henneberg, Prince-bishop (1475–1487)
Heinrich Groß von Trockau, Prince-bishop (1487–1501)

County of Castell (complete list) –
Leonard, Count (1399–1426)
William II, Count (1426–1479)
Frederick IX, Count (1479–1498)
John III, Count (1498–1500)
George I, Count (1498–1528)
Wolfgang I, Count (1498–1546)

Prince-Bishopric of Eichstätt (complete list, de) –
, Prince-bishop (1383–1415)
, Prince-bishop (1415–1429)
, Prince-bishop (1429–1445)
, Prince-bishop (1445–1464)
, Prince-bishop (1464–1496)
, Prince-bishop (1496–1535)

Hohenlohe-Weikersheim –
Kraft V, Count (1429–1472)
Kraft VI, Count (1472–1503)

Prince-Bishopric of Würzburg (complete list) –
Johann I von Egloffstein, Prince-bishop (1400–1411)
Johann II von Brunn, Prince-bishop (1411–1440)
Sigmund of Saxony, Prince-bishop (1440–1443)
Gottfried I von Limpurg, Prince-bishop (1443–1455)
Johann III von Grumbach, Prince-bishop (1455–1466)
Rudolf II von Scherenberg, Prince-bishop (1466–1495)
Lorenz von Bibra, Prince-bishop (1495–1519)

Electoral Rhenish

Elector-Archbishopric of Cologne (complete list) –
Friedrich III von Saarwerden, Archbishop-elector (1372–1414)
Dietrich II von Moers, Archbishop-elector (1414–1463)
Ruprecht of the Palatinate, Archbishop-elector (1463–1480)
Hermann IV of Hesse, Archbishop-elector (1480–1508)

Elector-Bishopric of Mainz (complete list) –
Johann II von Nassau, Archbishop-elector (1397–1419)
Conrad III of Dhaun, Archbishop-elector (1419–1434)
Dietrich Schenk von Erbach, Archbishop-elector (1434–1459)
Diether von Isenburg, Archbishop-elector (1460–1461)
Adolph II of Nassau, Archbishop-elector (1461–1475)
Diether von Isenburg, Archbishop-elector ((restored) 1476–1482)
Adalbert of Saxony, Archbishop-elector (1482–1484)
Berthold von Henneberg, Archbishop-elector (1484–1504)

Electoral Palatinate (complete list) –
Palatinate-Mosbach
Palatinate-Neumarkt
Palatinate-Simmern
Palatinate-Zweibrücken
Robert III the Righteous, Elector (1398–1410)
Louis III the Bearded, Elector (1410–1436)
Stephen I, Count Palatine of Simmern (1410–1459)
John I, Count Palatine of Neumarkt (1410–1443)
Otto I, Count Palatine of Mosbach (1410–1461)
Louis IV the Meek, Elector (1436–1449)
Christopher I, Count Palatine of Neumarkt (1443–1448)
Frederick I the Victorious, Elector (1449–1476)
Frederick I the Pious, Count Palatine of Simmern (1459–1480)
Louis I the Black, Count Palatine of Zweibrücken (1459–1489)
Otto II the Mathematician, Count Palatine of Mosbach (1461–1490)
Philip I the Upright, Elector (1476–1508)
John I, Count Palatine of Simmern (1480–1509)
Kaspar, co-Count Palatine of Zweibrücken (1489–1490)
Alexander I the Lame, Count Palatine of Zweibrücken (1489–1514)

Nieder-Isenburg (Lower Isenburg) (complete list) –
Salentin IV, Count (1370–1420)
Salentin V, Count (1420–1458)
Gerlach I, Count (1458–1490)
James, Count (1486–1503)
Gerlach II, Count (1488–1502)

Elector-Bishopric of Trier (complete list) –
Werner von Falkenstein, Archbishop-elector (1388–1417)
Lenihan von Weideburg, Archbishop-elector (1417–1419)
Otto von Ziegenhain, Archbishop-elector (1419–1430)
Rhaban von Helmstadt, Archbishop-elector (1430–1438)
Jakob von Sierk, Archbishop-elector (1439–1456)
Johann II of Baden, Archbishop-elector (1456–1503)

Lower Rhenish–Westphalian

Bentheim-Bentheim (complete list) –
Bernard I, Count (1364–1421)
Eberwin I, Count (1421–1454)
Bernard II, Count (1454–1473)
Eberwin II, Count (1473–1530)

Bentheim-Lingen (complete list) –
Otto, Count (1450–1508)
Nicholas III, Count (1493–1508)

Bentheim-Steinfurt (complete list) –
Arnold I, Count (1454–1466)
Eberwin II, Count (1466–1498)
Arnold II, Count (1498–1544)

Bentheim-Tecklenburg (complete list) –
Nicholas II, Count (1388–1426)
Otto VII, Count (1426–1450)
Nicholas III of Bentheim-Lingen, Count (1450–1493)
Otto VIII, Count (1493–1526)

Duchy of Cleves, County of Mark (complete list, complete list) –
Adolph I, Duke of Cleves (1394–1448), Count of Mark (1398–1448)
Gerhard, Regent (1437–1461)
John I, Duke of Cleves, Count of Mark (1448–1481)
John II the Pious, Duke of Cleves, Count of Mark (1481–1521)

Princely Abbey of Corvey (de:complete list) –
, Prince-abbot (1398–1408)
Dietrich III von Runst, Prince-abbot (1408–1417)
, Prince-abbot (1417–1435)
Arnold III von der Malsburg, Prince-abbot (1435–1463)
Hermann II.von Stockhausen, Prince-abbot (1463–1479)
Hermann III von Bömelberg, Prince-abbot (1479–1504)

Essen Abbey (complete list) –
Margarete I, Princess-Abbess (1413–1426)
Elisabeth IV Stecke von Beeck, Princess-Abbess (1426–1445)
Sophia I von Daun-Oberstein, Princess-Abbess (1445–1447)
Elisabeth V von Saffenberg, Princess-Abbess (1447–1459)
Sophia II von Gleichen, Princess-Abbess (1459–1489)
Meina von Daun-Oberstein, Princess-Abbess (1489–1521)

County of East Frisia (complete list) –
Ulrich I, Count (1464–1466)
Theda Ukena, Regent (1466–1480)
Enno I, Count (1480–1491)
Edzard I the Great, Count (1491–1528)

Duchy of Guelders
Dukes (complete list) –
William I, Duke (1379–1402)
William II, Duke (1371–1377)
Reginald IV, Duke (1402–1423)
John II, Regent (1423–1436)
Arnold, Duke (1423–1465, 1471–1473)
Adolf, Duke (1465–1471)
Charles I, Duke (1473–1477)
Mary, Duchess (1477–1482)
Maximillian I, Duke (1477–1482)
Philip I, Duke (1482–1492)
Charles II, Duke (1492–1538)
Stadtholders (complete list) –
William IV of Egmont, Stadtholder (1473–1475)
William V of Egmont, Stadtholder (1475–1476)
Philip I of Croÿ-Chimay, Stadtholder (1474–1477)
William V of Egmont, Stadtholder (1480–1481)
Adolf III of Nassau-Wiesbaden-Idstein, Stadtholder (1481–1492)

Herford Abbey (complete list) –
Hillegund of Oetgenbach, Abbess (1374–1409)
Mechthild III of Waldeck, Abbess (1409–1442)
Margaret of Brunswick-Grubenhagen, rival abbess 1442–1443
Margaret I of Gleichen, Abbess (1443–1475)
Jakobe of Neuenahr, rival abbess 1476–1479
Anna I of Hunolstein, Abbess (1476–1494)
Bonizet of Limburg-Stirum, Abbess (1494–1524)

Prince-Bishopric of Liège (complete list) –
John of Bavaria, Prince-Bishop (1389–1418)
John of Walenrode, Prince-Bishop (1418–1419)
John of Heinsberg, Prince-Bishop (1419–1455)
Louis of Bourbon, Prince-Bishop (1456–1482)
John of Hornes, Prince-Bishop (1484–1505)

Limburg-Broich (complete list) –
Henry, Count (1439–1446)
William, Count (1446–1473)
John, Count (1473–1508)

Duchy of Luxemburg
Dukes (complete list) –
Jobst, Duke (1388–1411)
Elisabeth, Duchess (1411–1443)
Anthony, Duke (1411–1415)
John II, Duke (1418–1425)
Philip I, Duke (1443–1467)
Charles II, Duke (1467–1477)
Mary I, Duchess (1477–1482)
Maximilian I, Duke (1477–1482)
Philip II, Duke (1482–1506)
Stadtholders (complete list) –
Antoine I de Croÿ, Stadtholder (1451–1475)

Prince-Bishopric of Münster (complete list) –
Otto IV of Hoya, Prince-bishop (1392–1424)
Henry II of Moers, Prince-bishop (1424–1450)
Walram of Moers, Prince-bishop (1450–1456)
Eric I of Hoya, Prince-bishop (1450–1457)
John of Pfalz-Simmern, Prince-bishop (1457–1466)
Henry III, Prince-bishop (1466–1496)
Conrad II of Rietberg, Prince-bishop (1497–1508)

County of Oldenburg (complete list) –
Christian VI, Count (1398–1423)
Dietrich the Lucky, Count (1423–1440)
Christian VII, in), Count (1440–1448)
Gerhard VI the Quarrelsome, Count (1448–1483)
Adolph, Count of Oldenburg-Delmenhorst, Count (1483–1500)
John V, Count (1500–1526)

Prince-Bishopric of Osnabrück (complete list) –
Dietrich of Horne, Prince-bishop (1376–1402)
Henry I of Schauenburg-Holstein, Prince-bishop (1402–1410)
, Prince-bishop (1410–1424)
, Prince-bishop (1424–1437)
, Prince-bishop (1437–1442)
, Prince-bishop (1442–1450)
, Prince-bishop (1450–1454)
Rudolf von Diepholz, Prince-bishop (1454–1455)
, Prince-bishop (1455–1482)
, Prince-bishop (1482–1508)

Prince-Bishopric of Paderborn (complete list) –
Bertrando d'Arvazzano, Prince-bishop (1399–1401)
William I of Berg, Prince-bishop (1400–1414)
, Prince-bishop (1414–1463)
Simon III, Bishop of Paderborn, Prince-bishop (1463–1498)
Hermann IV of Hesse, Prince-bishop (1498–1508)

County of Runkel (complete list) –
Frederick, co-Count (1403–1440)
Theodoric IV, Count (1403–1460)
John, Count (1460–1521)

County of Schaumburg (complete list) –
, Count (1370–1404)
, Count (1404–1426)
, Count (1426–1464)
, Count (1464–1474)
, Count (1474–1492)
, Count (1492–1510)

Prince-Bishopric of Utrecht (complete list) –
Frederik III van Blankenheim, Prince-bishop (1393–1423)
Rudolf van Diepholt, Prince-bishop (1423–1455)
Zweder van Culemborg, Prince-bishop (1425–1433)
Walraven van Meurs, Prince-bishop (1434–1448)
Gijsbrecht van Brederode, Prince-bishop (1455–1456)
David of Burgundy, Prince-bishop (1456–1496)
Frederick IV of Baden, Prince-bishop (1496–1517)

Prince-Bishopric of Verden (complete list) –
Dietrich of Nieheim, Prince-Bishop (1395–1398/1401)
Henry of Hoya, Prince-Bishop (1407–1426)
Ulrich of Albeck, Prince-Bishop (1407–1409/1417)
John of Asel, Prince-Bishop (1426–1470)
Berthold of Landsberg, Prince-Bishop (1470–1502)

Isenburg-Wied –
William II, Count of Isenburg-Braunsberg (1383–1388), of Isenburg-Wied (1388–1409)
Gerlach I, Count (1409–1413)
John II, co-Count (1415–1454)
William III, co-Count (1413–1462)

County of Wied (complete list) –
Frederick I, Count (1462–1487)
William III, Count (1487–1526)
John I, Count (1487–1533)

Upper Rhenish

Duchy of Bar (complete list) –
Robert, Duke (1354–1411)
Edward III, Duke (1411–1415)
Louis I, Duke (1415–1431)
René I, Duke (1420s–1480)
Yolanda, Duke (1480–1483)
René II, Duke (1483–1508)

Prince-Bishopric of Basel (complete list) –
Humbrecht von Neuenburg, Prince-bishop (1399–1418)
Hartmann II von Munchenstein, Prince-bishop (1418–1423)
Johann IV von Fleckenstein, Prince-bishop (1423–1436)
Friedrich von der Pfalz, Prince-bishop (1437–1451)
Arnold von Rothburg, Prince-bishop (1451–1458)
Johann V von Venningen, Prince-bishop (1458–1478)
Caspar von Mühlhausen, Prince-bishop (1479–1502)

Free City of Frankfurt (de:complete list) –
Rudolf III. von Praunheim-Sachsenhausen, Stadtschultheißen (1389–1408)
, Stadtschultheißen (1445–1455)

Princely Abbey of Fulda (complete list) –
, Prince-abbot (1395–1440)
, Prince-abbot (1440–1449)
, Prince-abbot (1449–1472)
, Prince-abbot (1472–1513)

Landgraviate of Hesse (complete list) –
Herman II the Learned, Landgrave (1376–1413)
Louis II the Peaceful, Landgrave (1413–1458)

Upper Hesse (complete list) –
Henry III the Rich, Landgrave (1458–1483)
Louis III the Younger, co-Landgrave (1474–1478)
William III the Younger, Landgrave (1483–1500)

Lower Hesse/ Hesse (complete list) –
Louis III the Frank, Landgrave (1458–1471)
William I the Elder, Landgrave (1471–1493)
William II the Middle, Landgrave of Lower Hesse (1493–1500), of Hesse (1500–1509)

Isenburg-Grenzau (complete list) –
Philip II, Count (1399–1439)

Isenburg-Kempenich (complete list) –
Simon III, Count (1367–1420)
John, Count (1367–1424)

Isenburg-Limburg (complete list) –
John II, Count (1365–1406)

Isenburg-Wied (complete list) –
William II, Count (1388–1409)
Gerlach I, Count (1409–1413)
William III, Count (1413–1462)
John II, Count (1415–1454)

Leiningen-Dagsburg –
Friedrich IX, Count (?–1467)
Margaret, Countess (1467–?)

Leiningen-Hardenburg (de:complete list) –
Emich VI, Count (15th century–1452)
Emich VII, Count (1452–1495)
Emich VIII, Count (1495–1535)

Duchy of Lorraine (complete list) –
Charles II, Duke (1390–1431)
Isabella, Duchess suo jure (1431–1453), with René, Duke (1431–1453)
John II, Duke (1453–1470)
Nicholas I, Duke (1470–1473)
Yolande, Duchess suo jure (1473)
René II, Duke (1473–1508)

County of Nassau-Beilstein –
Henry II, co-Count (1388–1410)
Reinhard, co-Count (1388–1412)
John I, co-Count (1412–1473)
Henry III, co-Count (1412–1477)
Henry IV, Count (1473–1499)
John II, Count (1499–1513)

Nassau-Saarbrücken (complete list) –
Philip I, Count (1381–1429)
John II, Count (1429/42–1472)
John Louis, Count (1472–1545)

Nassau-Weilburg (complete list) –
Philip I, Count (1371–1429)
John II, Count (1429–1442)
Philip II, Count (1429–1492)
Louis I, Count (1492–1523)

Lower Salm (complete list) –
Henry VII, Count (1370–1416)
Otto, Count (1416–1455)
John I, Count (1455–1475)
John II, Count (1475–1479)
Peter, Count (1479–1505)
John III, Count (1505–1537)
John IV, Count (1537–1559)
Werner, Count (1559–1629)
Ernst Frederick, Altgrave (1629–1639)

Upper Salm (complete list) –
John IV, Count (1397–1431)
Simon III, Count (1431–1475)
John V, Rhinegrave (1475–1495)
John VI, Rhinegrave (1495–1499)

Salm-Badenweiler (complete list) –
John V, Count (1431–1451)
John VI, Count (1451–1505)

Salm-Blankenburg (complete list) –
Henry IV, Count (1396–1441)
Frederick II, Count (1441–1442)
Theobald III, Count (1442–1443)
Louis, Count (1443–1503)

Salm-Blankenburg (complete list) –
Louis, Count (1443–1503)

Salm-Dhaun (complete list) –
Philip, Rhinegrave (1499–1521)

County of Sayn (complete list) –
John III, Count (1359–1403)
Gerard I, Count (1403–1419)
Theodore, Count (1419–1452)
Gerard II, Count (1452–1493)
Gerhard III, Count (1493–1506)

Prince-Bishopric of Sion (complete list) –
loyal to Avignon
Aymon Séchala, Prince-Bishop, loyal to Avignon (1398–1404)
Jacques de Challant, Prince-Bishop, loyal to Avignon (1404–1417)
loyal to Rome
Guillaume IV, Prince-Bishop, loyal to Rome(1394–1402)
Guillaume V of Rarogne, Prince-Bishop, loyal to Rome (1402–1418)
after schism
André dei Benzi of Gualdo, Prince-Bishop (1418–1437)
Guillaume VI of Rarogne, Prince-Bishop (1437–1451)
Henri Asperlin, Prince-Bishop (1451–1457)
Walter Supersaxo, Prince-Bishop (1457–1482)
Jost of Silenen, Prince-Bishop (1482–1496)
Nicolas Schiner, Prince-Bishop (1496–1499)
Mathieu Schiner, Prince-Bishop (1499–1522)

Solms-Braunfels (complete list) –
Otto I, Count (1349–1410)
Bernhard II, Count (1409–1459)
Otto II, Count (1459–1504)

Prince-Bishopric of Speyer (complete list) –
Nikolaus I aus Wiesbaden, Prince-bishop (1388–1396)
Raban of Helmstatt, Prince-bishop (1396–1438)
Reinhard of Helmstatt, Prince-bishop (1438–1456)
Siegfried III Freiherr of Venningen, Prince-bishop (1456–1459)
Johann II Nix of Hoheneck, Prince-bishop (1459–1464)
Matthias Freiherr of Rammingen, Prince-bishop (1464–1478)
Ludwig of Helmstädt, Prince-bishop (1478–1504)

Prince-Bishopric of Strasbourg (complete list) –
Wilhelm II von Diest, Prince-Bishop (1394–1439)
Konrad IV von Busnang, Prince-Bishop (1439–1440)
Ruprecht von Pfalz-Simmern, Prince-Bishop (1440–1478)
Albrecht von Pfalz-Mosbach, Prince-Bishop (1478–1506)

County of Waldeck-Landau, Older Line –
Adolph III, Count (1397–1431)
Otto III, Count (1431–1459)
Otto IV, Count (1459–1495)

County of Waldeck-Waldeck –
Henry VII, Count (1397–c.1444)
Wolrad I, Count (c.1442–1475)
Philip I, Count (1475)
Henry VIII, Count of Waldeck-Waldeck (1475–1486), of Waldeck-Widlungen (1486–1512)

County of Waldeck-Eisenberg –
Philip II, Regent (1475–1486), Count (1486–1524)

County of Waldeck-Widlungen, Older Line –
Henry VIII, Count of Waldeck-Waldeck (1475–1486), of Waldeck-Widlungen (1486–1512)

Prince-Bishopric of Worms (complete list) –
Echard von Dersch, Prince-bishop (1370–1405)
Matthew of Kraków, Prince-bishop (1405–1410)
Johann II von Fleckenstein, Prince-bishop (1410–1426)
Eberhard III von Sternberg, Prince-bishop (1426–1427)
Friedrich II von Domneck, Prince-bishop (1427–1445)
Ludwig von Ast, Prince-bishop (1445)
Reinhard I von Sickingen, Prince-bishop (1445–1482)
Johann von Dalberg, Prince-bishop (1482–1503)

Lower Saxon

Saxe-Mölln (complete list) –
Eric III, Duke (1370–1401)
inherited by Saxe-Ratzeburg to unite Saxe-Lauenburg

Saxe-Ratzeburg (complete list) –
Eric IV, Duke of Saxe-Ratzeburg (1368–1401), co-Duke of Saxe-Lauenburg (1401–1411/12)

Saxe-Lauenburg (complete list) –
Eric IV, Duke of Saxe-Ratzeburg (1368–1401), co-Duke of Saxe-Lauenburg (1401–1411/12)
John IV, co-Duke (1401–1412)
Eric V, co-Duke (1401–1435)
Bernard II, co-Duke (1426–1463)
John V, co-Duke (1439–1507)

Duchy of Saxony, Albertine (complete list) –
Albert III the Bold, Duke (1464–1500)
George I the Bearded, Duke (1500–1539)

Prince-Archbishopric of Bremen (complete list) –
Otto II, Prince-archbishop (1395–1406)
John II, Prince-archbishop (1406–1421)
Nicholas of Oldenburg-Delmenhorst, Prince-archbishop (1422–1435)
Baldwin II, Prince-archbishop (1435–1441)
Gerard III, Prince-archbishop (1442–1463)
Henry II, Administrator (1463–1496)
John III, Prince-archbishop (1497–1511)

Principality of Brunswick-Wolfenbüttel/ Principality of Wolfenbüttel (complete list) –
Henry I the Mild, co-Prince of Lüneburg (1388–1416), co-Prince of Brunswick-Wolfenbüttel (1400–1409)
Bernard I, co-Prince of Lunenburg (1388–1409, 1428–1434), Prince of Brunswick-Wolfenbüttel (1400–1428)
Henry the Peaceful, co-Prince of Lunenburg (1416–1428), Prince of Wolfenbüttel (1428–1473)
William the Victorious, co-Prince of Lüneburg (1416–1428), of Wolfenbüttel (1428–1432, 1473–1482), of Calenberg (1432–1473), of Göttingen (1450–1473)
William IV the Younger, Prince of Calenberg (1473–1483, 1484–1491), of Göttingen (1473–1483, 1484–1495), of Brunswick-Wolfenbüttel (1482–1491)
Henry the Elder, Prince of Brunswick-Wolfenbüttel (1491–1514), co-Prince of Calenberg (1491–1494)

Gandersheim Abbey (complete list) –
Lutgard III, Princess-Abbess (1359–1402)
Sophia III, Princess-Abbess (1402–1412)
Agnes II of Brunswick-Grubenhagen, Princess-Abbess (1412–1439)
Elisabeth of Dorstadt, Princess-Abbess (1439)
Elisabeth, Princess-Abbess (1439–1452)
Sophia IV, Princess-Abbess (1452, 1467–1485)
Walburg, rival abbess (1452–67)
Agnes III, Princess-Abbess (1485–1504)

Principality of Göttingen (complete list) –
Otto II the One-eyed, Prince (1394–1463)
William the Victorious, co-Prince of Lüneburg (1416–1428), of Wolfenbüttel (1428–1432, 1473–1482), of Calenberg (1432–1473), of Göttingen (1450–1473)
William IV the Younger, Prince of Calenberg (1473–1483, 1484–1491), of Göttingen (1473–1483, 1484–1495), of Brunswick-Wolfenbüttel (1482–1491)
Frederick III the Restless, Prince (1482–1484)
inherited by Calenberg.

Principality of Calenberg (complete list) –
William the Victorious, co-Prince of Lüneburg (1416–1428), of Wolfenbüttel (1428–1432, 1473–1482), of Calenberg (1432–1473), of Göttingen (1450–1473)
William IV the Younger, Prince of Calenberg (1473–1483, 1484–1491), of Göttingen (1473–1483, 1484–1495), of Brunswick-Wolfenbüttel (1482–1491)
Henry the Elder, Prince of Brunswick-Wolfenbüttel (1491–1514), co-Prince of Calenberg (1491–1494)
Eric I, co-Prince of Brunswick-Wolfenbüttel (1491–1494), Prince of Calenberg (1491–1540)

Principality of Grubenhagen (complete list) –
Eric, co-Prince (1383–1427)
Henry III, co-Prince (1427–1464)
Albert II, co-Prince (1427–1485)
Ernest II, co-Prince (1440–1464)
Henry IV, Prince (1479–1526)
Philip I, Prince (1486–1551)

Prince-Bishopric of Hildesheim (complete list) –
, Prince-bishop (1399–1424)
Magnus of Saxe-Lauenburg, Prince-bishop (1424–1452)
Bernhard II of Brunswick-Lüneburg, Prince-bishop (1452–1458)
Ernst I of Schauenburg, Prince-bishop (1458–1471)
, Prince-bishop (1471–1481)
Berthold II of Landsberg, Prince-bishop (1481–1502)

Holstein-Pinneberg (Holstein-Schaumburg) (complete list) –
, Count (1370–1404)
, Count (1404–1426)
, Count (1426–1464)
, Count (1464–1474)
, Count (1474–1492)
, Count (1492–1510)

Holstein-Rendsburg (complete list) –
Gerhard VI, co-Count (1384–1404)
Henry III, Count (1404–1421)
Henry IV, Count (1421–1427)
Adolph XI, Count (1427–1459)
Gerhard VII, Count (1427–1433)
Adolphus VIII, Count (1427–1459)
Christian I, Count of Holstein-Rendsburg (1460–1474), Duke of Holstein (1474–1481)

Duchy of Holstein (complete list) –
Christian I, Count of Holstein-Rendsburg (1460–1474), Duke of Holstein (1474–1481)
John, Duke (1481–1513)

Holstein-Segeberg –
Albert II, Count (1397–1403)

Prince-bishopric of Lübeck (complete list) –
John VI, Prince-bishop (1399–1420)
John VII, Prince-bishop (1420–1439)
Nicholas II, Prince-bishop (1439–1449)
Arnold Westphal, Prince-bishop (1450–1466)
Albert II, Prince-bishop (1466–1489)
Thomas Grote, Prince-bishop (1489–1492)
Theodoric II, Prince-bishop (1492–1506)

Free City of Lübeck (complete list) –
, Mayor (1400–1425)
, Mayor (1406–1408, 1416-?)
, Mayor (1402)
, Mayor (1407–1436)
, Mayor (?–1440)
, Mayor (1408–1411)
, Mayor (1408–1409)
, Mayor (1409)
, Mayor (1408–1416)
, Mayor (1411–1412)
, Mayor (1427)
, Mayor (1412–1416)
, Mayor (1413)
, Mayor (1436–1451)
, Mayor (1432–1454)
, Mayor (1442–1461)
, Mayor (1443–1454)
, Mayor (1432–1434)
, Mayor (1441–1465)
, Mayor (1454–1462)
, Mayor (1457–1474)
, Mayor (1466–1484)
, Mayor (1461–1474)
, Mayor (1475–1477)
, Mayor (1462–1488)
, Mayor (1484–1493)
, Mayor (1475–1501)
, Mayor (1479–1487)
, Mayor (1494–1498)
, Mayor (1487–1502)
, Mayor (1489–1501)
, Mayor (1498–1510)

Principality of Lüneburg (complete list) –
Bernard I, co-Prince of Lunenburg (1388–1409, 1428–1434), Prince of Brunswick-Wolfenbüttel (1400–1428)
Henry I the Mild, co-Prince of Lüneburg (1388–1416), co-Prince of Brunswick-Wolfenbüttel (1400–1409)
Henry the Peaceful, co-Prince of Lunenburg (1416–1428), Prince of Wolfenbüttel (1428–1473)
William the Victorious, co-Prince of Lüneburg (1416–1428), of Wolfenbüttel (1428–1432, 1473–1482), of Calenberg (1432–1473), of Göttingen (1450–1473)
Otto IV the Lame, Prince (1434–1446)
Frederick II the Pious, Prince (1434–1457, 1471–1478)
Bernard II, co-Prince (1457–1464)
Otto V the Magnanimous, co-Prince (1457–1471)
Henry the Middle, Prince (1486–1520)

Prince-Archbishopric of Magdeburg (complete list) –
Albert III of Querfurt, Prince-archbishop (1382–1403)
Günther II of Schwarzburg, Prince-archbishop (1403–1445)
Frederick III of Beichlingen, Prince-archbishop (1445–1464)
John II of Palatinate-Simmern, Prince-archbishop (1464–1475)
Ernest II of Saxony, Prince-archbishop (1475–1513)

Duchy of Mecklenburg-Schwerin (complete list) –
Albert III, Duke (1384–1412)
John IV, Duke (1384–1422)
Albert V, Duke (1412–1423)
John V, Duke (1423–1442/43)
Henry IV the Fat, Duke of Mecklenburg-Schwerin (1422–1471), of Mecklenburg (1471–1477)
John VI, Duke of Mecklenburg-Schwerin (1451–1471), of Mecklenburg (1471–1472)
Magnus II, co-Duke of Mecklenburg (1477–1479), of Mecklenburg-Schwerin (1479–1483), of Mecklenburg (1483–1503)
Balthasar, co-Duke of Mecklenburg-Schwerin (1479–1483), of Mecklenburg (1483–1507)

Mecklenburg-Stargard (complete list) –
John II, co-Duke (1392/93–1416)
Ulrich I, co-Duke (1392/93–1417)
John III, co-Duke (1416–1438)
Albert II, co-Duke (1417–1421/23)
Henry I Gaunt, Duke (1417–1466)
Ulrich II, Duke (1466–1471)
inherited by Mecklenburg-Schwerin to unite Mecklenburg

Mecklenburg (complete list) –
John VI, Duke of Mecklenburg-Schwerin (1451–1471), of Mecklenburg (1471–1472)
Henry IV the Fat, Duke of Mecklenburg-Schwerin (1422–1471), of Mecklenburg (1471–1477)
Albert VI, co-Duke of Mecklenburg (1477–1479), of Mecklenburg-Güstrow (1479–1483)
Magnus II, co-Duke of Mecklenburg (1477–1479), of Mecklenburg-Schwerin (1479–1483), of Mecklenburg (1483–1503)
Balthasar, co-Duke of Mecklenburg-Schwerin (1479–1483), of Mecklenburg (1483–1507)

Duchy of Mecklenburg-Güstrow (complete list) –
Albert VI, co-Duke of Mecklenburg (1477–1479), of Mecklenburg-Güstrow (1479–1483)

County of Oldenburg (complete list) –
, Count (1398–1423)
Dietrich the Lucky, Count (1423–1440)
Christian VII, Count (1440–1448)
Gerhard VI the Quarrelsome, Count (1448–1483)
Adolph, Count of Oldenburg-Delmenhorst, Count (1483–1500)
John V, Count (1500–1526)

Werle-Güstrow (complete list) –
John VII, co-Lord (1393/94–1414)
Balthasar, co-Lord (1393/94–1421)
William, co-Lord of Werle-Güstrow (1401–1425), Lord of Werle (1425–1436)

Werle-Waren (complete list) –
Nicholas V, co-Lord (1395–1408)
Christopher, co-Lord (1395–1425)
inherited by Hohenlohe-Güstrow to unite Werle

Werle (complete list) –
William, co-Lord of Werle-Güstrow (1401–1425), Lord of Werle (1425–1436)
inherited by Mecklenburg-Schwerin

Upper Saxon

Electorate of Saxony (complete list) –
House of Ascania
Rudolf III, Duke and Elector (1388–1419)
Albert III, Duke and Elector (1419–1422)
House of Wettin
Frederick I the Warlike, Duke and Elector (1423–1428)
Frederick II the Gentle, Duke and Elector (1428–1464)
House of Wettin, Ernestine branch
Ernest I, Elector (1464–1486)
Frederick III the Wise, Elector (1486–1525)

Anhalt-Bernburg (complete list) –
Otto III, Prince (1374–1404)
Otto IV, co-Prince (1404–1415)
Bernhard V, Prince (1404–1420)
Bernhard VI, Prince (1420–1468)
George I the Elder, co-Prince of Anhalt-Dessau (1405–1474), of Anhalt-Bernburg (1468–1474)
merged to Anhalt-Dessau

Anhalt-Zerbst (complete list) –
Sigismund I, co-Prince of Anhalt-Zerbst (1382–1396), Prince of Anhalt-Dessau (1396–1405)
Albert IV, co-Prince of Anhalt-Zerbst (1382–1396), Prince of Anhalt-Köthen (1396–1423)
partitioned into Anhalt-Dessau and Anhalt-Köthen

Anhalt-Dessau (complete list) –
Sigismund I, co-Prince of Anhalt-Zerbst (1382–1396), Prince of Anhalt-Dessau (1396–1405)
Valdemar IV, co-Prince (1405–1417)
Sigismund II, co-Prince (1405–1452)
Albert V, co-Prince (1405–1469)
George I the Elder, co-Prince of Anhalt-Dessau (1405–1474), of Anhalt-Bernburg (1468–1474)
Sigismund III, co-Prince (1474–1487)
George II the Strong, co-Prince (1474–1509)
Rudolph I the Valiant, co-Prince (1474–1510)
Ernest I, co-Prince (1474–1516)

Anhalt-Köthen (complete list) –
Albert IV, co-Prince of Anhalt-Zerbst (1382–1396), Prince of Anhalt-Köthen (1396–1423)
Waldemar V, co-Prince (1423–1436)
Adolph I, co-Prince (1423–1473)
Albert VI, co-Prince (1473–1475)
Philip, co-Prince (1475–1500)
Waldemar VI, co-Prince (1471–1508)
Adolph II, co-Prince (1475–1508)
Magnus, co-Prince (1475–1508), Prince (1475–1508)

Electorate of Brandenburg (complete list) –
House of Luxemburg
Jobst, Elector (1388–1411)
Sigismund, Elector (1378–1388, 1411–1415)
House of Hohenzollern
Frederick I, Elector (1415–1440), Margrave of Brandenburg-Ansbach (1398–1440), of Brandenburg-Kulmbach (1420–1440)
Frederick II, Elector (1440–1470)
Albrecht III Achilles, Margrave of Brandenburg-Ansbach (1440–1486), of Brandenburg-Kulmbach (1457–1486), Elector (1471–1486)
John VII Cicero, Elector (1486–1499)
Joachim I Nestor, Elector (1499–1535)

Margravate of Meissen (complete list) –
William I, Margrave (1349–1407)
George, Margrave (1381–1402)
William II, Margrave (1381–1425)
Frederick IV, Margrave (1381–1428)
Frederick V, Margrave (1407–1440)

Pomerania-Stolp (complete list) –
Barnim V, co-Duke of Pomerania-Stargard (1377–1394/5), of Pomerania-Stolp (1394/5–1403)
Bogislaw VIII Magnus, co-Duke of Pomerania-Stargard (1377–1394/95), of Pomerania-Stolp (1394/95–1418)
Bogislav IX, Duke (1418–1446)
Maria of Masovia, Regent (1446–1449)
Eric I, Duke (1446–1459)
Eric II, Duke of Pomerania-Wolgast (1457–1474), of Pomerania-Stolp (1459–1474), of Pomerania-Stettin (1464–1474)

Pomerania-Barth (complete list) –
Swantibor II the Calm, co-Duke of Pomerania-Wolgast (1415–1425), of Pomerania-Barth (1425–1432)
Barnim VIII the Younger, co-Duke of Pomerania-Wolgast (1415–1425), of Pomerania-Barth (1425–1451)
Wartislaw X, Duke (1457–1478)
then inherited by Bogislaw X the Great to unite Pomerania

Pomerania-Stettin, Duchy of Pomerania (complete list) –
Bogislaw VII the Older, co-Duke of Pomerania-Stettin (1372–1404)
Swantibor I, co-Duke of Pomerania-Stettin (1372–1413)
Otto II, co-Duke of Pomerania-Stettin (1413–1428)
Casimir V, co-Duke of Pomerania-Stettin (1413–1435)
council of regency, Pomerania-Stettin (1435–1443)
Joachim the Younger, Duke of Pomerania-Stettin (1443–1451)
Otto III, Duke of Pomerania-Stettin (1460–1464)
Eric II, Duke of Pomerania-Wolgast (1457–1474), of Pomerania-Stolp (1459–1474), of Pomerania-Stettin (1464–1474)
Bogislaw X the Great, Duke of Pomerania-Wolgast and Pomerania-Stettin (1474–1478), of Pomerania (1478–1523)

Pomerania-Wolgast, Duchy of Pomerania (complete list) –
Barnim VI, co-Duke of Pomerania-Wolgast (1394–1405)
Wartislaw VIII, co-Duke of Pomerania-Wolgast (1393–1415)
Agnes of Saxe-Lauenburg, Regent of Pomerania-Wolgast (1415–1425)
Swantibor II the Calm, co-Duke of Pomerania-Wolgast (1415–1425), of Pomerania-Barth (1425–1432)
Barnim VIII the Younger, co-Duke of Pomerania-Wolgast (1415–1425), of Pomerania-Barth (1425–1451)
Barnim VII the Older, co-Duke of Pomerania-Wolgast (1405–1450)
Wartislaw IX, co-Duke of Pomerania-Wolgast (1405–1457)
Eric II, Duke of Pomerania-Wolgast (1457–1474), of Pomerania-Stolp (1459–1474), of Pomerania-Stettin (1464–1474)
Bogislaw X the Great, Duke of Pomerania-Wolgast and Pomerania-Stettin (1474–1478), of Pomerania (1478–1523)

Reuss-Lobenstein (complete list) –
Heinrich II, Lord (1425–1470)
Heinrich I, Lord (1482–1487)
Heinrich II, Lord (1482–1500)
Heinrich III, Lord (1482–1498)
Heinrich I, Lord (1500–1538)
Heinrich II, Lord (1500–1547)

County of Stolberg (de:complete list) –
Heinrich zu Stolberg, Count (?–post-1402)
Botho zu Stolberg, Count (c.1370–1455)
Heinrich IX zu Stolberg, Count (1436–1511)

Landgraviate of Thuringia (complete list) –
Balthasar, Landgrave (1349–1406)
Frederick IV, Landgrave (1406–1440)
Frederick V, Landgrave (1440–1445)
William II, Landgrave (1445–1482)
Albert, Landgrave (1482–1485)
Ernest, Landgrave (1482–1486)
Frederick VI, Landgrave (1486–1525)

Swabian

Prince-Bishopric of Augsburg (complete list) –
Burkhard of Ellerbach, Prince-bishop (1373–1404)
Eberhard II of Kirchberg, Prince-bishop (1404–1413)
Friedrich of Grafeneck, Prince-bishop (1413–1414)
Anselm of Nenningen, Prince-bishop (1414–1423)
Peter of Schaumberg, Prince-bishop (1424–1469)
John II, Prince-bishop (1469–1486)
Friedrich von Hohenzollern, Prince-bishop (1486–1505)

 (complete list) –
John I, co-Margrave (1386–1409)
Hesso II, co-Margrave (1386–1410)
Otto II, Margrave (1410–1415)
Bernard I, Margrave of Baden-Pforzheim (1372–1431), of Baden-Baden (1391–1431), of Baden-Hachberg (1415–1431)

 (complete list) –
Bernard I, Margrave of Baden-Pforzheim (1372–1431), of Baden-Baden (1391–1431), of Baden-Hachberg (1415–1431)
James I, Margrave (1431–1453)
Bernard II, co-Margrave (1453–1458)
Charles I, Margrave (1453–1475)
Christopher I, Margrave of Baden-Baden (1475–1503), of Baden (1503–1515)

 (complete list) –
Rudolph III, Margrave (1352–1428)
William I, Margrave (1428–1441)
Hugo I, Margrave (1441–1444)
Rudolph IV, Margrave (1441–1487)
Philip I, Margrave (1487–1503)

Prince-Bishopric of Constance (complete list) –
, Prince-bishop (1398–1406)
Otto III of Hachberg, Prince-bishop (1410–1434)
, Prince-bishop (1434–1436)
, Prince-bishop (1436–1462)
, Prince-bishop (1463–1466)
, Prince-bishop (1466–1474)
, Prince-bishop (1474–1479)
, Prince-bishop (1480–1491)
, Prince-bishop (1491–1496)
Hugo von Hohenlandenberg, Prince-bishop (1496–1529; 1531/2)

Ellwangen Abbey/ Prince-Provostry of Ellwangen (complete list/ complete list) –
Siegfried Gerlacher, Prince-abbot (1401–1427)
Johann of Holzingen, Prince-abbot (1427–1452)
Johann of Hürnheim, Prince-abbot (1452–1460), Prince-provost (1460–1461)
Albrecht V of Rechberg, Prince-provost (1461–1502)

Fürstenberg-Baar (complete list) –
Conrad V, Count (1441–1484)
Henry IX, Count (1484–1499)
Wolfgang, Count (1499–1509)

Gutenzell Abbey (de:complete list) –
Agnes, Princess-abbess (fl.1437)
Dorothea Neth, Princess-abbess (fl.1437–1444)
Ottilia Durlacher, Princess-abbess (fl.1449–1450)
Ursula Egloffer, Princess-abbess (fl.1478)
Walburga Gräter, Princess-abbess (c.1478–1503)

Princely Abbey of Kempten (complete list) –
Frederick VI of Hirschdorf, Prince-abbot (1382–1405)
de:Friedrich VII von Laubenberg, Prince-abbot (1405–1434)
Pilgrim II of Wernau, Prince-abbot (1434–1451)
Gerwig II of Sulmentingen, Prince-abbot (1451–1460)
Johann I of Wernau, Prince-abbot (1460–1481)
:de:Johann von Riedheim 1481–1507)

Königsegg (complete list) –
Marquard, Baron (1470–1500)
John IV, Baron (1500–1544)

Lindau Abbey (de:complete list) –
Ursula I von Sigberg, Princess-abbess (1466–1467)
Ursula II von Prassberg, Princess-abbess (1467–1491)
, Princess-abbess (1491–1531)

Principality of Mindelheim (complete list) –
Georg von Frundsberg, Lord (1478–1528)
Ulrich X, Lord (1467–1478)
Georg II, Lord (1478–1528)

Oettingen-Wallerstein (complete list) –
John I the Solemn, Count (1423–1449)
Ludwig XIII, Count (1449–1486)

Weingarten Abbey (complete list) –
Johann I von Essendorf, Prince-abbot (1393–1418)
Johann II Blaarer von Guttingen und Wartensee, Prince-abbot (1418–1437)
Erhard von Freybank, Prince-abbot (1437–1455)
Jobst Penthelin von Ravensburg, Prince-abbot (1455–1477)
Kaspar Schieck, Prince-abbot (1477–1491)
Hartmann von Knorringen-Burgau, Prince-abbot (1491–1520)

Barony of Westerburg (complete list) –
Reinhard II of Westerburg (1354–1421)
Reinhard III of Westerburg, Baron (?–1449)
Cuno I of Westerburg, Baron (1425–1459)
Reinhard IV, Baron (1453–1522)

County/ Duchy of Württemberg (complete list) –
Eberhard III, Count (1392–1417)
Eberhard IV, Count (1417–1419)
Ludwig I, Count (1419–1450)
Ulrich V, Count (1419–1480)
Ludwig II, Count (1450–1457)
Eberhard I, Duke of Württemberg, Count (1459–1495), Duke (1495–1496)
Eberhard II, Duke of Württemberg, Count of Württemberg-Stuttgart (1480–1482), Duke (1496–1498)
Ulrich, Duke of Württemberg, Duke (1498–1519, 1534–1550)

Swiss Confederacy

Italy

Republic of Genoa (complete list) –
Giorgio Adorno, Doge (1413–1415)
Barnaba Guano, Doge (1415–1415)
Tomaso di Campofregoso, Doge (1415–1421, first reign)
Isnardo Guarco, Doge (1436)
Tomaso di Campofregoso, Doge (1436–1437, second reign)
Battista Fregoso, Doge (1437)
Tomaso di Campofregoso, Doge (1437–1442, third reign)
Raffaele Adorno, Doge (1443–1447)
Barnaba Adorno, Doge (1447)
Giano I di Campofregoso, Doge (1447–1448)
Lodovico di Campofregoso, Doge (1448–1450, first reign)
Pietro di Campofregoso, Doge (1450–1458)
Prospero Adorno, Doge (1461)
Spinetta Fregoso, Doge (1461)
Lodovico di Campofregoso, Doge (1461–1462, second reign)
Paolo Fregoso, Doge (1462)
Lodovico di Campofregoso, Doge (1462, third reign)
Paolo Fregoso, Doge (1462–1463, second reign)
Francesco Sforza, ruler (1463–1477)
Prospero Adorno, Doge (1477, second reign)
Battista Fregoso, Doge (1478–1483)
Paolo Fregoso, Doge (1483–1488, third reign)

Republic of Lucca –
Paolo Guinigi, Lord (1400–1430)

Duchy of Milan/ Golden Ambrosian Republic (complete list) –
Gian Galeazzo Visconti, Duke (1395–1402)
Caterina Visconti, Regent (1402–1404)
Gian Maria Visconti, Duke (1402–1412)
Filippo Maria Visconti, Duke (1412–1447)
Captains and Defenders of the Golden Ambrosian Republic (1447–1450)
Francesco I Sforza, Duke (1450–1466)
Galeazzo Maria Sforza, Duke (1466–1476)
Gian Galeazzo Sforza, Duke (1476–1494)
Bona of Savoy, Regent (1476–1481)
Ludovico Sforza, Regent (1481–1494), Duke (1494–1499)
Louis XII of France, Duke (1499–1512)

Principality of Orange (complete list) –
Mary, Princess, and John I, Prince (1393–1417)
Louis II, Prince (1417–1463)
William VII, Prince (1463–1475)
John IV, Prince (1475–1502)

Papal States (complete list) –
Boniface IX, Pope (1389–1404)
Innocent VII, Pope (1404–1406)
Gregory XII, Pope (1406–1415)
Martin V, Pope (1417–1431)
Eugene IV, Pope (1431–1447)
Nicholas V, Pope (1447–1455)
Callixtus III, Pope (1455–1458)
Pius II, Pope (1458–1464)
Paul II, Pope (1464–1471)
Sixtus IV, Pope (1471–1484)
Innocent VIII, Pope (1484–1492)
Alexander VI, Pope (1492–1503)

Duchy of Savoy (complete list) –
Amadeus VIII, Count (1391–1416), Duke (1416–1440)
Louis, Duke (1440–1465)
Amadeus IX, Duke (1465–1472)
Philibert I, Duke (1472–1482)
Charles I, Duke (1482–1490)
Charles (II) John Amadeus, Duke (1490–1496)
Philip II, Duke (1496–1497)
Philibert II, Duke (1497–1504)

References 

15th century
 
-
15th century in the Holy Roman Empire